Norman Tunna  (29 April 1908 – 4 December 1970), a shunter for the Great Western Railway in Birkenhead was awarded the George Cross in 1941.

Early life

Tunna was born in Birkenhead on 29 April 1908, the son of Charles and Emily Tunna, his father was a railway porter.

George Cross award
On 26 September 1940, Tunna was at work at Morpeth Dock, Birkenhead when an air raid commenced.  Ignoring the bombing, Tunna continued his work, marshalling a goods train where the main freight being carried was high explosive bombs for use by the Royal Air Force.  While making a final inspection of the train before it departed, he came across one wagon laden with  bombs alight due to a number of incendiary bombs having landed upon it.  Fetching a bucket of water in an attempt to extinguish the fire, he was joined by the engine crew of the train and while they fetched more water, Tunna removed the wagonsheet hoping that this would also drag the incendiaries off the wagon.  It did dislodge one but another fell into the wagon between some of the bombs.  Tunna climbed into the wagon and prised the incendiary out, throwing it away from the wagon.  He then joined the enginemen in pumping water over the wagon until they considered the bombs to have been cooled to a safe temperature.

Tunna's bravery in preventing what would have been a large explosion was rewarded by the award of the George Cross.

He was awarded the medal on 24 January 1941. The citation reads:-

Memorials

Between 15 November 1982 and July 1996, British Rail named Class 47 locomotive, 47471, after Tunna.  The locomotive was named in a ceremony at Liverpool Lime Street railway station.

In September 2010 a plaque was unveiled at Birkenhead Central railway station by Merseyrail on the 70th anniversary of the heroic action.

An older memorial stands in the gardens at Woodside Ferry and Bus terminal, comprising a stone plinth bearing a plaque with the George Cross citation from the London Gazette engraved on it.

References

British recipients of the George Cross
Great Western Railway people
1908 births
1970 deaths